Haedropleura secalina is a species of sea snail, a marine gastropod mollusk in the family Horaiclavidae.

It was previously included within the family Turridae, the turrids.

It has been found as a fossil in the Redonien Formation in France.

Description

Distribution
This species occurs in the entire Mediterranean Sea, especially off Southern Italy; and off Turkey; in the Atlantic Ocean off the Canary Islands and Funchal.

References

 Philippi, R.A. (1844) Enumeratio molluscorum siciliae cum viventium tum in tellure terziaria fossilium quae in itinere suo observavit auctor. Volumen secundum continens addenda et emendanda, nec non-comparationem faunae recentis siciliae cum faunis aliarum terrarum et cum fauna periodi tertiariae. Halis Saxonum, E. Anton., 303 pp
 Micali P. 2010. Nota sul genere Haedropleura B.D.D., 1883 nel Mediterraneo. Malacologia Mostra Mondiale 67: 3–5

External links
  Tucker, J.K. 2004 Catalog of recent and fossil turrids (Mollusca: Gastropoda). Zootaxa 682:1–1295.

secalina
Taxa named by Rodolfo Amando Philippi